Mathieu Arzeno (born 18 August 1987 in Salon-de-Provence) is a French rally driver and former racing driver. He scored his first World Rally Championship point on 2012 Rallye Deutschland finishing tenth overall in a Peugeot 207 S2000.

Career

Circuit racing
Arzeno started off in karting, before stepping up to single-seaters 2005 when he finished second in Formula Renault Campus behind champion Jean-Karl Vernay. The following year he raced in French Formula Renault, finishing seventh overall before improving to the runner-up spot in 2007 behind Jules Bianchi. In 2008 he came tenth in the Eurocup Formula Renault 2.0, but skipped two of the seven meetings due to a lack of budget.

Rallying
In 2009 Arzeno switched to rallying and promptly finished 12th overall and third in class on the iconic Monte Carlo Rally. In 2010 he contested the Junior World Rally Championship before focussing on the French tarmac championship in 2011.

WRC results

JWRC results

References

External links
 Official website
 Profile at ewrc-results.com

1987 births
Living people
French rally drivers
French racing drivers
French Formula Renault 2.0 drivers
Formula Renault Eurocup drivers
Formula Renault 2.0 WEC drivers
World Rally Championship drivers
Intercontinental Rally Challenge drivers
French F4 Championship drivers
Epsilon Euskadi drivers
Graff Racing drivers
FIA Motorsport Games drivers
Saintéloc Racing drivers